1982 is a 2013 drama film written and directed by Tommy Oliver and starring Hill Harper.  It is Oliver's directorial debut.  The film is also semi-autobiographical. The film marked the final appearance of actress and activist Ruby Dee before her death in 2014.

Plot

The film is set in Philadelphia 1982. Tim Brown walks in the kitchen to Shenae who is washing dishes. He wraps his arms around her while saying "Scrabble" to their daughter Maya. Maya responses saying "with ice cream too" handing Tim a dish rag while saying "ice cream too, yay" and running out the kitchen. Tim says to Shenae "food was amazing babe" Shenae responds by mentioning she spoke to Tim's mom but in fact she only called to talk to Maya. Tim leaves the kitchen after being shocked that his mom and Shenae spoke but Shenae mentions she spoke to Maya. Later on that night the family played Scrabble and Shenae asks how does Maya know so many words especially such as Panacea and she goes on to define the word for Shenae before Tim puts her in bed to say goodnight and puts change in her Michaelangelo bank.

The next day, Maya is talking to Micah about the ball some men took from her. She attempts to take the ball back but they keep it from her and the little boy. Alonzo starts walking over to them and tells one of men to give the ball back; the guy asks why and he repeats "give them the ball back." The man gives the ball to Maya and says he was just playing as Maya walks away. Alonzo then grabs the man and say don't make me have to ask you to do something twice and burns his face with the cigarette he was smoking. Alonzo then ask the rest of the guys if they have anything else to say (no one says anything).

Back at the house, Shenae is cleaning and Tim decides to put on a song by The Stylistics. While the record is playing, Tim calls out to Shenae while she is in the kitchen. She says what walking to the room he was in and he insist they dance together in the living room. He tells her he has tickets for Breakwater, Frankie Smith, and Pieces of a Dream at 7pm. Shenae declines and says she is going out with Neecy's instead. Maya walks in and starts to go upstairs but Tim tells her to come sit and talk with him. He then asks about the book she is reading. Maya mentions The Iliad, she misplaced it however states how she likes it a lot while her mom Shenae walks in interrupting their talk for a kiss. Maya kisses her mom and goes up stairs. Tim starts to record Shenae with a tape recorder and she mentioned how she hates that thing and Tim stops. Tim and Scoop are leaving work and Scoop asked Tim for a ride, Tim takes him to his house. Shenae is braiding Maya's hair where they run into Shenae outside after she tells Maya she is done. Maya ask to go outside and that's where she runs into Alonzo saying he has a lollipop for her, Maya says bye and leaves after Shenae tells her too. Shenae ask Alonzo why he was at her house - he states he was checking in on her. He then hands her heroin in a dime bag. Tim pulls up with Scoop; Tim ask Shenae who was that; referring to Alonzo walking off. Ignoring the question she asks why Scoop was there at their house. Shenae ignores the question by telling Scoop "you know that's why I don’t like you". Scoop states how he doesn't like her either then tells Tim bye and walks away. Shenae tells Tim his mother calls while he walks in the house not before asking what's for dinner. Shenae replies she doesn't know and sits on the steps outside staring at the small bag of drugs.

Later that night, Shenae is crying on the sofa holding a small teddy bear as Maya walks down the stairs she asked Shenae if she is okay. Shenae wipes her tears and says she's fine and holds Maya. Maya asked her if she wants her to sing a song. Maya starts singing to her mom. Week 2 Shenae comes in at 7am and wakes Tim. He tells her it's 7:00 and asks where she was last night. Tim knocks on Neecy's door and angrily asks her if his wife slept at her house last night. She first says no and then as he walks away she says yes she left that morning. Tim goes through the motions waiting for Shenae to get home and she mentioned she was at Neecy's and he asks her about the guy that she was talking to the other day. She says no and goes to pack her things mentioning she's going to Neecy's. She runs into Maya on her way out and states they both need a scrabble rematch Saturday at 2. Unfortunately, Saturday came and Shenae never showed up. Tim tells Maya Shenae was helping Neecy while she was sick and he got her Jim's cheesesteak.

Cast
Hill Harper as Tim Brown
Sharon Leal as Shenae Brown
Bokeem Woodbine as Scoop
La La Anthony as Neecy
Quinton Aaron as Turtle
Wayne Brady as Alonzo
Ruby Dee as Rose Brown
Troi Zee as Maya Brown
Chaz Dausuel as Terrence

Release
The film premiered at the 2013 Toronto International Film Festival and later made its multi-platform release in March 2016.

Reception
On review aggregator website Rotten Tomatoes, the film holds an approval rating of 78% based on nine reviews, and an average rating of 7/10.

Sheri Linden of The Hollywood Reporter gave the film a positive review and wrote, "Suitably low-key but sometimes under-realized, this drama is fueled by its working-class milieu and a heart-wrenching performance by Hill Harper."

See also
List of black films of the 2010s

References

External links
 
 

2010s English-language films
2013 films
Lionsgate films
2013 drama films
African-American drama films
2013 directorial debut films
Films set in 1982
2010s American films